The Indiana Basketball Hall of Fame is a sports museum and hall of fame in New Castle, Indiana. While it honors men and women associated with high school, college, and professional basketball in Indiana, an emphasis is placed on the athlete's high school career for induction.

History
The Indiana Basketball Hall of Fame was organized in 1962. The museum was in Indianapolis from 1970 to 1986; the present-day facility in New Castle opened in 1990.

In addition to featuring its Hall of Fame inductees, the museum includes photographs, pennants, and displays of artifacts of championship teams and their schools.

Inductees
Players become eligible for induction into the Hall of Fame "twenty-six years after they graduate from high school." The first women became eligible for induction following the 2000–2001 season. On March 1, 2002, Cinda Rice Brown became the first woman inducted onto the Hall of Fame.

The Hall of Fame's website provides an official list of inductees; notables include John Wooden, Everett Case, Oscar Robertson, Lee H. Hamilton, Larry Bird, Del Harris, Baron Hill, Gregg Popovich, Bobby Plump, and Chuck Taylor.

See also
Indiana High School Boys Basketball Tournament

References

External links
 

Basketball museums and halls of fame
Basketball in Indiana
High school basketball in the United States
High school sports in Indiana
College sports in Indiana
Halls of fame in Indiana
State sports halls of fame in the United States
Sports museums in Indiana
Museums in Henry County, Indiana
New Castle, Indiana
1962 establishments in Indiana
Museums established in 1990